Harrison Township is located in Winnebago County, Illinois. As of the 2010 census, its population was 670 and it contained 273 housing units.

Geography 

Demographics

References

External links
City-data.com
Winnebago County Official Site

1849 establishments in Illinois
Populated places established in 1849
Rockford metropolitan area, Illinois
Townships in Illinois
Townships in Winnebago County, Illinois